Joanna Fiodorow (born 4 March 1989) is a Polish retired athlete who specialized in the hammer throw.

In 2014 she won the bronze medal at the European Championships with a throw of 73.67 m.

She competed at the 2012 Olympic Games in London and the 2016 Olympic Games in Rio, taking 9th place in both finals.

Her personal best throw is 75.09 meters, achieved in 2017 in Cetniewo.

In 2012 she was coached by Czesław Cybulski.

Competition record

References

External links

1989 births
Living people
Polish female hammer throwers
Athletes (track and field) at the 2012 Summer Olympics
Athletes (track and field) at the 2016 Summer Olympics
Olympic athletes of Poland
People from Augustów
Sportspeople from Podlaskie Voivodeship
World Athletics Championships athletes for Poland
World Athletics Championships medalists
European Athletics Championships medalists
Universiade medalists in athletics (track and field)
Universiade silver medalists for Poland
Universiade bronze medalists for Poland
Medalists at the 2015 Summer Universiade
Medalists at the 2017 Summer Universiade
Competitors at the 2011 Summer Universiade
Athletes (track and field) at the 2020 Summer Olympics